Hendra Wijaya may refer to:
 Hendra Wijaya (footballer)
 Hendra Wijaya (badminton)